Rahel Enzler (born 30 July 2000) is a Swiss ice hockey player and member of the Swiss national team, currently playing with the Maine Black Bears women's ice hockey program in the Hockey East (HEA) conference of the NCAA Division I.

Playing career   
She played five games with the ZSC Lions Frauen, the women's representative team of the ZSC Lions, during the 2015–16 SWHL A season in addition to playing with the Seewen under-15 and under-17 teams in the Mini A and Top Novizen respectively.

Enzler joined SC Reinach Damen, the women's representative team of SC Reinach, in 2017. She served as Reinach's captain during the 2019–20 season of the Women's League (SWHL A; renamed from Swiss Women's Hockey League A in 2019). 

For the 2020–21 season, she joined the Maine Black Bears women's ice hockey program as an incoming freshman.

International 
Enzler represented Switzerland in the women's ice hockey tournament at the 2022 Winter Olympics in Beijing and at the IIHF Women's World Championship in 2017, 2019 and 2021.

As a junior player with the Swiss national under-18 team, she participated in the IIHF U18 Women's World Championship in 2015, 2016, 2017 and 2018. She won a bronze medal while serving as alternate captain to the Swiss under-16 team in the girls' ice hockey tournament at the 2016 Winter Youth Olympics in Lillehammer.

Personal life
Her brother, is a football player who has represented Switzerland with the under-18, under-19, and under-20 national teams.

Career Statistics

References

External links
 
 

2000 births
Living people
Ice hockey players at the 2022 Winter Olympics
Ice hockey players at the 2016 Winter Youth Olympics
Maine Black Bears women's ice hockey players
Olympic ice hockey players of Switzerland
Sportspeople from the canton of Zug
Swiss expatriate ice hockey people
Swiss women's ice hockey forwards
Swiss Women's League players
Youth Olympic bronze medalists for Switzerland
21st-century Swiss women